"Po' Folks" (Bill Anderson song), 1961
"Po' Folks" (Nappy Roots song), 2001
Po' Folks (restaurant), a defunct American restaurant chain named after the Bill Anderson song